Malpasse is a town in the Croix-des-Bouquets Arrondissement in the Ouest department of Haiti. Its border crossing to Jimaní is one of the four chief land crossings to the Dominican Republic.

References

Populated places in Ouest (department)
Dominican Republic–Haiti border crossings